Rosacea is a long-term skin condition that typically affects the face. It results in redness, pimples, swelling, and small and superficial dilated blood vessels. Often, the nose, cheeks, forehead, and chin are most involved. A red, enlarged nose may occur in severe disease, a condition known as rhinophyma.

The cause of rosacea is unknown. Risk factors are believed to include a family history of the condition. Factors that may potentially worsen the condition include heat, exercise, sunlight, cold, spicy food, alcohol, menopause, psychological stress, or steroid cream on the face. Diagnosis is based on symptoms.

While not curable, treatment usually improves symptoms. Treatment is typically with metronidazole, doxycycline,  minocycline, or tetracycline. When the eyes are affected, azithromycin eye drops may help. Other treatments with tentative benefit include brimonidine cream, ivermectin cream, and isotretinoin. Dermabrasion or laser surgery may also be used. The use of sunscreen is typically recommended.

Rosacea affects between 1% and 10% of people. Those affected are most often 30 to 50 years old and female. People with paler skin or European ancestry are more frequently affected. The condition was described in The Canterbury Tales in the 1300s, and possibly as early as the 200s BC by Theocritus.

Signs and symptoms 

Rosacea typically begins with reddening (flushing) of the skin in symmetrical patches near the center of the face. Common signs can depend on age and sex: flushing and red swollen patches are common in the young, small and visible dilated blood vessels in older individuals, and swelling of the nose is common in men. Other signs include lumps on the skin (papules or pustules) and swelling of the face. Many people experience stinging or burning pain and rarely itching.

Skin problems tend to be aggravated by particular trigger factors, that differ for different people. Common triggers are ultraviolet light, heat, cold, or certain foods or beverages.

Erythematotelangiectatic rosacea 

Erythematotelangiectatic rosacea rosacea (also known as "vascular rosacea") is characterized by prominent history of prolonged (over 10 minutes) flushing reaction to various stimuli, such as emotional stress, hot drinks, alcohol, spicy foods, exercise, cold or hot weather, or hot baths and showers.

Glandular rosacea 

In glandular rosacea, men with thick sebaceous skin predominate, a disease in which the papules are edematous, and the pustules are often 0.5 to 1.0 cm in size, with nodulocystic lesions often present.

Cause 

The exact cause of rosacea is unknown. Triggers that cause episodes of flushing and blushing play a part in its development. Exposure to temperature extremes, strenuous exercise, heat from sunlight, severe sunburn, stress, anxiety, cold wind, and moving to a warm or hot environment from a cold one, such as heated shops and offices during the winter, can each cause the face to become flushed. Certain foods and drinks can also trigger flushing, such as alcohol, foods and beverages containing caffeine (especially hot tea and coffee), foods high in histamines, and spicy foods.

Medications and topical irritants have also been known to trigger rosacea flares. Some acne and wrinkle treatments reported to cause rosacea include microdermabrasion and chemical peels, as well as high dosages of isotretinoin, benzoyl peroxide, and tretinoin.

Steroid-induced rosacea is caused by the use of topical steroids. These steroids are often prescribed for seborrheic dermatitis. Dosage should be slowly decreased and not immediately stopped to avoid a flare-up.

Cathelicidins 

In 2007, Richard Gallo and colleagues noticed that patients with rosacea had high levels of  cathelicidin, an antimicrobial peptide, and elevated levels of stratum corneum tryptic enzymes (SCTEs). Antibiotics have been used in the past to treat rosacea, but they may only work because they inhibit some SCTEs.

Demodex folliculitis and Demodex mites 

Studies of rosacea and Demodex mites have revealed that some people with rosacea have increased numbers of the mite, especially those with steroid-induced rosacea. Demodex folliculitis (demodicidosis, also known as "mange" in animals) is a condition that may have a "rosacea-like" appearance.

A 2007, National Rosacea Society-funded study demonstrated that Demodex folliculorum mites may be a cause or exacerbating factor in rosacea. The researchers identified Bacillus oleronius as distinct bacterium associated with Demodex mites. When analyzing blood samples using a peripheral blood mononuclear cell proliferation assay, they discovered that B. oleronius stimulated an immune system response in 79 percent of 22 patients with subtype 2 (papulopustular) rosacea, compared with only 29% of 17 subjects without the disorder. They concluded, "The immune response results in inflammation, as evident in the papules (bumps) and pustules (pimples) of subtype 2 rosacea. This suggests that the B. oleronius bacteria found in the mites could be responsible for the inflammation associated with the condition."

Intestinal bacteria 

Small intestinal bacterial overgrowth (SIBO) was demonstrated to have greater prevalence in rosacea patients and treating it with locally acting antibiotics led to rosacea lesion improvement in two studies. Conversely in rosacea patients who were SIBO negative, antibiotic therapy had no effect. The effectiveness of treating SIBO in rosacea patients may suggest that gut bacteria play a role in the pathogenesis of rosacea lesions.

Diagnosis 

Most people with rosacea have only mild redness and are never formally diagnosed or treated.  No test for rosacea is known. In many cases, simple visual inspection by a trained health-care professional is sufficient for diagnosis.  In other cases, particularly when pimples or redness on less-common parts of the face is present, a trial of common treatments is useful for confirming a suspected diagnosis. The disorder can be confused or co-exist with acne vulgaris or seborrheic dermatitis.  The presence of a rash on the scalp or ears suggests a different or co-existing diagnosis because rosacea is primarily a facial diagnosis, although it may occasionally appear in these other areas.

Classification 

Four rosacea subtypes exist, and a patient may have more than one subtype:

 Erythematotelangiectatic rosacea exhibits permanent redness (erythema) with a tendency to flush and blush easily. Also small, widened blood vessels visible near the surface of the skin (telangiectasias) and possibly intense burning, stinging, and itching are common. People with this type often have sensitive skin. Skin can also become very dry and flaky. In addition to the face, signs can also appear on the ears, neck, chest, upper back, and scalp.
 Papulopustular rosacea presents with some permanent redness with red bumps (papules); some pus-filled pustules can last 1–4 days or longer. This subtype is often confused with acne.
 Phymatous rosacea is most commonly associated with rhinophyma, an enlargement of the nose. Signs include thickening skin, irregular surface nodularities, and enlargement. Phymatous rosacea can also affect the chin (gnathophyma), forehead (metophyma), cheeks, eyelids (blepharophyma), and ears (otophyma). Telangiectasias may be present.
 In ocular rosacea, affected eyes and eyelids may appear red due to telangiectasias and inflammation, and may feel dry, irritated, or gritty. Other symptoms include foreign-body sensations, itching,  burning, stinging, and sensitivity to light. Eyes can become more susceptible to infection. About half of the people with subtypes 1–3 also have eye symptoms.  Blurry vision and vision loss can occur if the cornea is affected.

Variants 

Variants of rosacea include:
 Pyoderma faciale, also known as rosacea fulminans, is a conglobate, nodular disease that arises abruptly on the face.
 Rosacea conglobata is a severe rosacea that can mimic acne conglobata, with hemorrhagic nodular abscesses and indurated plaques.
 Phymatous rosacea is a cutaneous condition characterized by overgrowth of sebaceous glands.  Phyma is Greek for swelling, mass, or bulb, and these can occur on the face and ears.

Treatment
The type of rosacea a person has informs the choice of treatment. Mild cases are often not treated at all, or are simply covered up with normal cosmetics.

Therapy for the treatment of rosacea is not curative, and is best measured in terms of reduction in the amount of facial redness and inflammatory lesions, a decrease in the number, duration, and intensity of flares, and concomitant symptoms of itching, burning, and tenderness. The two primary modalities of rosacea treatment are topical and oral antibiotic agents. Laser therapy has also been classified as a form of treatment. While medications often produce a temporary remission of redness within a few weeks, the redness typically returns shortly after treatment is suspended.  Long-term treatment, usually 1–2 years, may result in permanent control of the condition for some patients. Lifelong treatment is often necessary, although some cases resolve after a while and go into a permanent remission.  Other cases, if left untreated, worsen over time. Some people has also reported better results after changing diet. This is not confirmed by medical studies, even though some studies relate the histamine production to outbreak of rosacea.

Behavior 

Avoiding triggers that worsen the condition can help reduce the onset of rosacea, but alone will not normally lead to remission except in mild cases. Keeping a journal is sometimes recommended to help identify and reduce food and beverage triggers.

Because sunlight is a common trigger, avoiding excessive exposure to the sun is widely recommended.  Some people with rosacea benefit from daily use of a sunscreen; others opt for wearing hats with broad brims. Like sunlight, emotional stress can also trigger rosacea. People who develop infections of the eyelids must practice frequent eyelid hygiene.

Managing pretrigger events such as prolonged exposure to cool environments can directly influence warm-room flushing.

Medications 

Medications with good evidence include topical ivermectin and azelaic acid creams and brimonidine, and doxycycline and isotretinoin by mouth. Lesser evidence supports topical metronidazole cream and tetracycline by mouth.

Metronidazole is thought to act through anti-inflammatory mechanisms, while azelaic acid is thought to decrease cathelicidin production. Oral antibiotics of the tetracycline class such as doxycycline, minocycline, and oxytetracycline are also commonly used and thought to reduce papulopustular lesions through anti-inflammatory actions rather than through their antibacterial capabilities.

Using alpha-hydroxy acid peels may help relieve redness caused by irritation, and reduce papules and pustules associated with rosacea. Oral antibiotics may help to relieve symptoms of ocular rosacea. If papules and pustules persist, then sometimes isotretinoin can be prescribed. The flushing and blushing that typically accompany rosacea are typically treated with the topical application of alpha agonists such as brimonidine and less commonly oxymetazoline or xylometazoline.

A review found that ivermectin was more effective than alternatives for treatment of papulopustular acne rosacea. An ivermectin cream has been approved by the FDA, as well as in Europe, for the treatment of inflammatory lesions of rosacea. The treatment is based upon the hypothesis that parasitic mites of the genus Demodex play a role in rosacea. In a clinical study, ivermectin reduced lesions by 83% over 4 months, as compared to 74% under a metronidazole standard therapy.  Quassia amara extract at 4% demonstrated to have clinical efficacy for rosacea. When compared to metronidazole 0.75% as usual care in a randomized, double-blinded clinical trial, Quassia amara extract at 4% demonstrated earlier onset of action, including improvement in telangiectasia, flushing, and papules. Quassia amara showed a sustained reduction of global assessment score at day 42 (reduced to 4.68 from baseline 7.65) compared to metronidazole at day 42 (reduced to 6.32 from baseline 7.2), p<0.001.

Laser 

Evidence for the use of laser and intense pulsed-light therapy in rosacea is poor.

Outcomes 
The highly visible nature of rosacea symptoms are often psychologically challenging for those affected. People with rosacea can experience issues with self-esteem, socializing, and changes to their thoughts, feelings, and coping mechanisms.

Epidemiology 

Rosaceae affects around 5% of people worldwide. Incidence varies by ethnicity, and is particularly prevalent in those with Celtic heritage. Men and women are equally like to develop rosacea.

See also 

 Seborrheic dermatitis
 Keratosis pilaris

References

External links 

 
 Rosacea photo library at Dermnet
 Questions and Answers about Rosacea, from the US National Institute of Arthritis and Musculoskeletal and Skin Diseases

Acneiform eruptions
Erythemas
Cutaneous conditions